Omkar Shah is an Indian politician who was the member of Chhattisgarh Legislative Assembly from Bindranawagarh Assembly constituency (no 52) then Raipur district, (now Gariaband district), during 2003–2008. He resides at Village and Post - Chhura in Gariaband district.

References

Living people
People from Gariaband district
Year of birth missing (living people)
Chhattisgarh MLAs 2003–2008
Indian National Congress politicians